Santa Bernardina International Airport  is a military and general aviation airport serving Durazno, capital of the Durazno Department of Uruguay.

The facilities are shared with the Tte. 2° Mario W. Parallada Air Base of the Uruguayan Air Force.

The Durazno VOR-DME (Ident: DUR) is located on the field. Several non-directional beacons are located around the airport.

Tte. 2° Mario W. Parallada Air Base
Tte. 2° Mario W. Parallada Air Base is a base of the Uruguayan Air Force that shares facilities at the Santa Bernardina International Airport.

Air Brigade No. 2 is stationed at the base. The brigade has three operating squadrons:
No. 2 Squadron flies 8 Cessna A-37 Dragonfly aircraft in fighter and ground attack missions.
Advanced Flight Squadron flies 5 Pilatus PC-7 training aircraft.
Enlace Squadron flies 4 Cessna 206 and 1 Cessna 210 aircraft in utility and liaison roles.

See also

Transport in Uruguay
List of airports in Uruguay
Tte. 2° Mario W. Parallada Air Base - Spanish Wikipedia

References

External links
OpenStreetMap - Durazno

Airports in Uruguay
Buildings and structures in Durazno Department